Jeret Schroeder (born November 13, 1969, Vineland, New Jersey, United States), is a former driver in the Indy Racing League. He raced in the 1997 and 1999-2002 seasons with 20 career starts, including the 1999-2001 Indianapolis 500. His best career finish was fourth at the 2000 Vegas Indy 300 won by Al Unser Jr. at the Las Vegas Motor Speedway. In that same 2000 Season, Schroeder led the rookie of the year standings until his car was struck by other drivers during the final 2 races to knock him out of the rookie points lead.

Motorsports Career Results

SCCA National Championship Runoffs

American Open-Wheel
(key) (Races in bold indicate pole position)

IndyCar

Indy 500 results

External links
Jeret Schroeder at ChampCarStats.com
Jeret Schroeder bio at Driver Database

1969 births
Living people
IndyCar Series drivers
Indianapolis 500 drivers
Atlantic Championship drivers
American Le Mans Series drivers
People from Vineland, New Jersey
Racing drivers from New Jersey
SCCA National Championship Runoffs participants
Sportspeople from Cumberland County, New Jersey
U.S. F2000 National Championship drivers

PDM Racing drivers